Reuschberg (Spessart) is a hill in the Spessart range, located in the Landkreis Aschaffenburg, part of the Franconia region of Bavaria, Germany. It has an elevation of 415 metres.

At its foot lies the town of Schöllkrippen. To the south is the valley of the Höllenbach, to the north that of the Kleiner Laudenbach, both of which flow into the Kahl.

There is a transmission mast on the hill, operated by Vodafone, located on the slope at an elevation of around 385 metres.

However, excavations in 2005 indicate that it most likely is a 10th-century refuge castle, with some elements added later (11th or 12th century). Over the centuries, locals have used the fortification as a source of construction materials, reducing the remains to just foundations.

The , a former monastery, lies on the lower slopes, just beneath the forest fringe.

References

Hills of Bavaria
Aschaffenburg (district)
Hills of the Spessart